Unakkaga Piranthen is a 1992 Indian Tamil-language romantic drama film, written and directed by Balu Anand, and produced by Vivekananda Pictures. The film stars Prashanth and Mohini.

Plot 

Radha is a Sri Lankan refugee, who has taken shelter in a refugee camp in India. When a camp guard tries to molest her, a local man called Krishnan comes to her rescue. They start meeting frequently and soon fall in love. When refugees are ordered back to Sri Lanka, Radha goes. Unable to bear the separation, Krishna decides to swim to Sri Lanka, but on reaching shore he is arrested by coastal guards who think he is a terrorist. Krishna manages to escape from captivity and find Radha.

Cast 

 Prashanth as Krishnan
 Mohini as Radha
 Sangeeta as Yamini
 Janagaraj as Radha's grandfather
 Vijay Krishnaraj as a police inspector

Soundtrack 
The music was composed by Deva, with lyrics written by Vaali and Kamakodiyan. For the dubbed Telugu version Prema Pujari, all lyrics were written by Rajasri.

Tamil

Telugu

Reception
The Indian Express wrote, "Balu Anand, the director, could have geared up the proceedings a bit as the slackness is obvious on certain portions". C. R. K. of Kalki wrote that the film's first half was good, but the director lost grip in the second half and the film became logicless.

References

External links 

1990s Tamil-language films
1992 films
1992 romantic drama films
Films directed by Balu Anand
Films scored by Deva (composer)
Films set in Sri Lanka
Indian romantic drama films